Sohr va Firuzan Rural District is a rural district (dehestan) in Pir Bakran District, Falavarjan County, Isfahan Province, Iran. At the 2006 census, its population was 13,191, in 3,550 families.  The rural district has 10 villages.

References 

Rural Districts of Isfahan Province
Falavarjan County